Siman Povarenkin is an Armenian entrepreneur with investments in metals & mining, geophysics and medical and health technology in Asia, Europe and Latin America. Povarenkin graduated from the Omsk State University with a degree in Chemistry and Petroleum Chemicals. In addition, he has completed courses in finance and banking at the Academy of Economics in Moscow, Bank Tutors Institute in Frankfurt, and the Intellectual Fund in Paris.

Povarenkin has over 15 years of corporate management experience in banking and industrial sectors. Previously he was Chairman of the Board of Industrial Investors Group, FESCO, Russian Industrial Bank and First Vice President, Head of Investment Management Business at Incombank. He served as director of Far Eastern Shipping Company Plc from June 5, 2007 to December 2008. He serves as Non-Executive Director of Saddleback Corporation Ltd.

GeoProMining 

One of Povarenkin’s substantial investments was in GeoProMining (GPM), an international gold and copper mining company with operations in Russia and Armenia.  He has previously served as Chairman of the Board of GPM, and is currently a member of Board of Directors and the Remuneration Committee.

In 2005, along with business partner at the time Sergey Generalov, he purchased one of the largest mining companies in Georgia, consisting of the Madneuli mine and its subsidiary Quartzite.  This was to become the first production asset of GeoProMining.   In 2007, the two divided up the assets of their shared investment vehicle Industrial Investors, with Povarenkin becoming the majority shareholder of GeoProMining.  He subsequently expanded GPM further,   acquiring various mining assets in the Caucasus region. In 2012 the firm sold its assets in Georgia.

GPM Asia 

Another mining project of Mr Povarenkin is GPM Asia. GPM Asia is not a part of GeoProMining Group. In 2009 GPM Asia acquired mining and processing operations located in Binh Thuan province in the south-east of Vietnam.  Key products are mineral sands - zircon and titanium dioxide minerals in the form of ilmenite, rutile and monazite. Mineral sands produced by GPM Asia are certified by SGS. The company is looking into expanding its operations in the region.

Personal life 

Povarenkin has a passion for European and Russian art, which influenced him to purchase the 19th-century chateau in Normandy (France), which was previously owned by Yves Saint Laurent.  Povarenkin is also a patron of theatrical arts and currently supports the theatre project Kvartet I which is based in Moscow.

He is a noted gastronome with a great interest in foods from around the world, and has studied the culinary arts from regions ranging from Latin America to South East Asia.

References

External links 
 geopromining.com
 The Moscow Times - A real gold mine - November 2011

1969 births
Living people
Povarenkin
Russian businesspeople in the United Kingdom